It’s Been a Bad Week is a British radio comedy on BBC Radio 2, that first broadcast on 11 February 1999. It is presented by Steve Punt and Hugh Dennis, and is also referred to as Punt and Dennis: It's Been a Bad Week. More than 100 episodes have been broadcast , the latest series ending on 22 June 2006. Mitch Benn has since confirmed the show has "bitten the dust". It was normally broadcast on Thursdays at 10pm, with each episode being repeated on Saturdays at 1:30pm. The show was recorded the week of broadcast at Ronnie Scott's Jazz Club.

The show was co-presented by regular guests Mitch Benn, Toby Longworth (Series 6 onwards), Sue Perkins (Series 6 onwards) and Simon Greenall (Series 8 onwards). Past co-presenters have been Mervyn Stutter (Series 1-2), Jon Culshaw (Series 1-5), Emma Clarke (Series 1-5) and Jo Caulfield (Series 6), although these varied in some weeks. One famous guest appearance was Canadian comedy legend Leslie Nielsen (series 3, episode 8). The other contributor to the show was their fictional sound effects man, "Van Man", so called because he supplied the sound effects from his white van, "illegally parked outside Ronnie Scott's."

It’s Been a Bad Week is a mock awards show, where true stories and urban legends alike compete for the tongue-twisting "The Worst Week of the Week Award, Awarded Weekly, on a Week-By-Week Basis".

Episodes are sometimes repeated on BBC Radio 4 Extra.



Format
Each show originally began with the "Bad Week Round-up", which is described as the section for "Bad Week stories they couldn't fit anywhere else". This was a quick two-minute recap of what had been going on in the news that week. This was later replaced with "Van Man's Week of Sound", where Van Man illustrated that week's news with his sound effects. Currently, Van Man just plays the main sound effect of the week. A recurring gag is that Van Man's sound effect seems to refer to one of the week's main news stories but actually refers to a different one.

The show consists of three sections, "Sections 1, 2 and 3". In each section, there are three or sometimes four stories from around the world of bad things which have really happened. Usually each section consists of one story related by Punt, one by Dennis and one by another presenter. Benn normally chooses a music-related candidate and sings a song relating to it, Longworth or Greenall often do stories about dumb criminals (frequently American), and Perkins covers something sexual. Sometimes there will be a "Bad Week Update", where a story previously featured returns, because either the same thing has happened again or a new aspect to the story has surfaced.

In every section, Van Man illustrates each story with his sound effects. Originally he also chose the winner of each section; now it is done by a topical "guest announcer" (impersonated). After the three finalists are chosen, the audience take their electronic keypads (also fictional) and vote for the winner of "The Worst Week of the Week Award, Awarded Weekly, on a Week-By-Week Basis". The prize changes from week to week, depending on the theme of the show.

The series has had several New Year specials, entitled It's Been A Bad Year, awarding (as it was put in one episode) "The Worst New Year of the New Year Award, Awarded New Yearly, on a First Week-by-First Week Basis". Further, the last show of the current year has a different award, "The Worst Week of the Year Award, Awarded Yearly on a Year-By-Year Basis"

Series

First series
11 February 1999
18 February 1999
25 February 1999
4 March 1999
11 March 1999
18 March 1999

Second series
29 July 1999
5 August 1999
12 August 1999
19 August 1999
26 August 1999
4 September 1999

Third series
17 February 2000
24 February 2000
2 March 2000
9 March 2000
16 March 2000
23 March 2000
30 March 2000
6 April 2000

Fourth series
23 November 2000
30 November 2000
7 December 2000
14 December 2000
21 December 2000
28 December 2000
4 January 2001
11 January 2001

Fifth series
17 November 2001
22 November 2001
29 November 2001
6 December 2001
13 December 2001
20 December 2001
27 December 2001

Sixth series
20 June 2002
27 June 2002
4 July 2002
11 July 2002
18 July 2002
25 July 2002
1 August 2002

Seventh series
31 October 2002
7 November 2002
16 November 2002
21 November 2002
28 November 2002
5 December 2002
12 December 2002
19 December 2002
26 December 2002
2 January 2003

Eighth series
15 May 2003
22 May 2003
29 May 2003
5 June 2003
12 June 2003
19 June 2003
26 June 2003
3 July 2003
10 July 2003
17 July 2003

Ninth series
13 November 2003
20 November 2003
27 November 2003
4 December 2003
11 December 2003
18 December 2003
25 December 2003
1 January 2004

Tenth series
13 May 2004
20 May 2004
27 May 2004
3 June 2004
10 June 2004
17 June 2004
24 June 2004
1 July 2004
8 July 2004

Eleventh series
23 December 2004
30 December 2004
6 January 2005
13 January 2005
20 January 2005
27 January 2005
3 February 2005
10 February 2005
17 February 2005

Twelfth series
2 June 2005
9 June 2005
16 June 2005
23 June 2005
30 June 2005
7 July 2005 (not broadcast owing to the London Bombings)

Thirteenth series
1 October 2005
8 October 2005
15 October 2005
22 October 2005
29 October 2005

Fourteenth series
18 May 2006
25 May 2006
1 June 2006
8 June 2006
15 June 2006
22 June 2006

See also
Darwin Awards
Ig Nobel Prize
Fark

External links
Celador (the broadcaster)
Episode guide at epguides.com

References

BBC Radio comedy programmes
BBC Radio 2 programmes
Ironic and humorous awards
1999 radio programme debuts